Jean Victory Coleman (9 November 1918 – 13 December 2008) was an Australian sprinter. At the 1938 British Empire Games she won an individual silver medal in the 220 yards and two gold medals with Australian relay teams.

References

External links

 Commonwealthgames.com results

1918 births
2008 deaths
Australian female sprinters
Athletes (track and field) at the 1938 British Empire Games
Commonwealth Games gold medallists for Australia
Commonwealth Games silver medallists for Australia
Commonwealth Games medallists in athletics
20th-century Australian women
21st-century Australian women
Medallists at the 1938 British Empire Games